Wortendyke-Demund House is located in Midland Park, Bergen County, New Jersey, United States. The house was built in 1797 and was added to the National Register of Historic Places on January 10, 1983.

See also
National Register of Historic Places listings in Bergen County, New Jersey

References

Houses on the National Register of Historic Places in New Jersey
Houses completed in 1797
Houses in Bergen County, New Jersey
Midland Park, New Jersey
National Register of Historic Places in Bergen County, New Jersey
Stone houses in New Jersey
New Jersey Register of Historic Places